Kevin Walsh (born 9 February 1962) is a former Australian rules footballer who played with Essendon in the VFL during the 1980s.

A centre half back, Walsh was a dual premiership player with Essendon in 1984 and 1985. He also played in their losing 1983 grand final. He won an E. J. Whitten Medal in 1986 for his performance for Victoria in a State of Origin game against South Australia. He also earned All Australian selection for his efforts. Walsh earned life membership at Essendon Football Club in 1992.

External links

1962 births
Living people
Australian rules footballers from Victoria (Australia)
Essendon Football Club players
Essendon Football Club Premiership players
Victorian State of Origin players
All-Australians (1953–1988)
E. J. Whitten Medal winners
Australia international rules football team players
Two-time VFL/AFL Premiership players